Pityrodia spenceri is a species of flowering plant in the mint family Lamiaceae and is endemic to the northern part of the Northern Territory. It is an erect shrub with hairy, heart-shaped or egg-shaped leaves, and white, tube-shaped flowers.

Description
Pityrodia spenceri is an erect shrub that has its branches densely covered with woolly, ash-coloured, branched hairs. The leaves are densely covered with branched, ash-coloured hairs. The flowers are sessile and arranged singly in leaf axils.

Taxonomy and naming
Pityrodia spenceri was first formally described in 1979 by Ahmad Abid Munir from specimens collected by Walter Baldwin Spencer and others near Edith Creek in 1911. The description was published in Journal of the Adelaide Botanic Gardens.

Distribution
This pityrodia occurs in the Kakadu and Nitmiluk National Parks in the northern part of the Northern Territory.

Conservation
Pityrodia spenceri is listed as "least concern" under the Territory Parks and Wildlife Conservation Act 2000.

References

serrata
Plants described in 1979
Flora of the Northern Territory